The 2021 Big 12 Conference baseball tournament was held from May 25 through 30 at Chickasaw Bricktown Ballpark in Oklahoma City, Oklahoma. The annual tournament determines the conference champion of the Division I Big 12 Conference for college baseball. The winner of the tournament earned the league's automatic bid to the 2021 NCAA Division I baseball tournament.

Format and seeding
Beginning with the 2021 tournament, all 9 teams will make the tournament. There will be a two-bracket double elimination tournament, leading to a winner-take-all championship game. The 8th and 9th placed teams will play a playin game to determine who will play in the bracket.

Results

Conference championship game

All-Tournament team

References

Tournament
Big 12 Conference Baseball Tournament
Big 12 Conference baseball tournament
Big 12 Conference baseball tournament
College sports tournaments in Oklahoma
Baseball competitions in Oklahoma City